Mixcoatlus is a small genus of pit vipers endemic to Mexico. The genus was created in 2011.

The name Mixcoatlus is derived from the Nahuatl word Mixcoatl or "cloud serpent", a deity of the Aztec and several other Mesoamerican civilizations. This name also refers to the geographic restriction of this clade to elevations above 2,000 meters.

Species
There are three species:
Mixcoatlus barbouri (Dunn, 1919)
Mixcoatlus browni (Shreve, 1938)
Mixcoatlus melanurus (Müller, 1923)

References

Crotalinae
Snakes of North America
Endemic reptiles of Mexico
Snake genera